The 2015 The National was held from November 11 to 15 at the General Motors Centre in Oshawa, Ontario. The National was the third Grand Slam event of the season for the men's and women's 2015–16 curling season.

Brad Gushue won his fourth Grand Slam title by defeating Reid Carruthers 7–2 in the men's final. Rachel Homan topped Tracy Fleury 5–4 in the women's final to also claim her fourth Slam title.

Men

Teams

Round-robin standings
Final round-robin standings

Round-robin results
All draw times listed in Eastern Standard Time (UTC-5).

Draw 1
Tuesday, November 10, 7:00 pm

Draw 2
Wednesday, November 11, 8:30 am

Draw 3
Wednesday, November 11, 12:00 pm

Draw 4
Wednesday, November 11, 3:30 pm

Draw 5
Wednesday, November 11, 7:30 pm

Draw 6
Thursday, November 12, 8:30 am

Draw 7
Thursday, November 12, 12:00 pm

Draw 8
Thursday, November 12, 3:30 pm

Draw 9
Thursday, November 12, 7:30 pm

Draw 10
Friday, November 13, 8:30 am

Draw 11
Friday, November 13, 12:00 pm

Draw 12
Friday, November 13, 3:30 pm

Playoffs

Quarterfinals
Saturday, November 14, 12:00 pm

Semifinals
Saturday, November 14, 7:30 pm

Final
Sunday, November 15, 12:00 pm

Women

Teams

Round-robin standings
Final round-robin standings

Round-robin results
All draw times listed in Eastern Standard Time (UTC-5).

Draw 1
Tuesday, November 10, 7:00 pm

Draw 2
Wednesday, November 11, 8:30 am

Draw 3
Wednesday, November 11, 12:00 pm

Draw 4
Wednesday, November 11, 3:30 pm

Draw 5
Wednesday, November 11, 7:30 pm

Draw 6
Thursday, November 12, 8:30 am

Draw 7
Thursday, November 12, 12:00 pm

Draw 8
Thursday, November 12, 3:30 pm

Draw 9
Thursday, November 12, 7:30 pm

Draw 10
Friday, November 13, 8:30 am

Draw 11
Friday, November 13, 12:00 pm

Draw 13
Friday, November 13, 7:30 pm

Tiebreakers
Saturday, November 14, 8:30 am

Playoffs

Quarterfinals
Saturday, November 14, 4:00 pm

Semifinals
Saturday, November 14, 7:30 pm

Final
Sunday, November 15, 4:00 pm

References

External links

2015 in Canadian curling
Curling in Ontario
The National
Sport in Oshawa
The National (curling)